Tarik Robinson-O'Hagan is an American track and field athlete.  He won the gold medal at the 2022 IAAF World Junior Championships in the shot put.

Personal life
From Woonsocket, Rhode Island he attended the Woonsocket High School, and was a two time Rhode Island State Champion. After graduating high school he chose to attend College at University of Mississippi after being impressed by the Ole Miss campus, team and coaches.

Career
He won the 2022 New Balance Nationals Outdoor in the shot put, discus, and the hammer at Franklin Field in Philadelphia. To appear at the USA Track and Field under-20 national championships in Eugene, Oregon his coach Marc Piette had to set up a GoFundMe page. It worked – the crowd funding got him to the nationals, for which he said he was incredibly grateful, and he won both the shot put and hammer (with a new PB) at the event.

He won the gold medal at the 2022 IAAF World Junior Championships in the shot put. He also reached the final in the hammer and finished in eighth place.

References

External links

Living people
American male shot putters
American male hammer throwers
American male discus throwers
World Athletics U20 Championships winners
Track and field athletes from Rhode Island
Year of birth missing (living people)